María Teresa Campoy Ruy Sánchez (born 15 October 1959) is a Mexican politician from the Ecologist Green Party of Mexico. From 2000 to 2003 she served as Deputy of the LVIII Legislature of the Mexican Congress representing Nuevo León.

References

1959 births
Living people
Politicians from Nuevo León
Women members of the Chamber of Deputies (Mexico)
Ecologist Green Party of Mexico politicians
21st-century Mexican politicians
21st-century Mexican women politicians
Deputies of the LVIII Legislature of Mexico
Members of the Chamber of Deputies (Mexico) for Nuevo León